The 1984 1. divisjon was the 40th completed season of top division football in Norway. The season began on 29 April 1984 and ended 14 October 1984, not including play-off matches.

Overview
22 games were played with 2 points given for wins and 1 for draws. Number eleven and twelve were relegated. The winners of the two groups of the 2. divisjon were promoted, as well as the winner of a series of play-off matches between number ten in the 1. divisjon and the two second-placed teams in the two groups of the 2. divisjon. 

Vålerengen won the championship, their fourth title.

Teams and locations
''Note: Table lists in alphabetical order.

League table

Results

Relegation play-offs
Results
Vidar 2–2 HamKam 
Moss 4–1 Vidar
HamKam 0–0 Moss

Season statistics

Top scorers

Attendances

References

Norway - List of final tables (RSSSF)
Norsk internasjonal fotballstatistikk (NIFS)

Eliteserien seasons
Norway
Norway
1